Princess Juliana International Airport  is the main airport on the Caribbean island of Saint Martin. The airport is located on the Dutch side of the island, in the country of Sint Maarten, close to the shore of Simpson Bay Lagoon. In 2015, the airport handled 1,829,543 passengers and around 60,000 aircraft movements. The airport serves as a hub for Winair and is the major gateway for the smaller Leeward Islands, including Anguilla, Saba, Saint Barthélemy and Sint Eustatius. It is named after Queen Juliana of the Netherlands, who landed there while she was heir presumptive in 1944, the year after the airport opened. The airport has very low-altitude flyover landing approaches because one end of its runway is extremely close to the shore and Maho Beach. While Princess Juliana International is the primary aviation gateway to the island, there is also a smaller public-use airport on the French side, in the French Collectivity of Saint Martin, called Grand Case-Espérance Airport.

History
The airport began as a US military airstrip in 1942 during World War II. The following year, first commercial flight landed on 3 December 1943. The future Queen Juliana visited the island using the airport in 1944. Eventually, the airport was named after her. In 1964 the airport was remodeled and relocated, with a new terminal building and control tower. The facilities were upgraded in 1985 and 2001.

Because of increased passenger traffic and the expected growth of passenger traffic in the near future, Princess Juliana International Airport is being heavily modernized following a three-phased masterplan, commissioned in 1997.

Phase I was a short-term programme in order to upgrade existing facilities and improve the level of service at various points. This included widening, strengthening and renovating the runway, increasing the bearing capacity of the taxiways, construction of a new apron and an upgrade of the (old) terminal. Phase I was completed in 2001.

The new air traffic control tower and the radar station commenced operations on 29 March 2004, while the new terminal opened in late October 2006. The terminal has 4 jetways for large aircraft like 747s. If traffic develops as forecast, Phase III of the masterplan will be executed, consisting of an extension of the new terminal building and the construction of a full parallel taxiway system.

In 1994, the Kingdom of the Netherlands and France signed the Franco-Dutch treaty on Saint Martin border controls, which allows for joint Franco-Dutch border controls on so-called "risk flights". After some delay, the treaty was ratified in November 2006 in the Netherlands, and subsequently entered into force on 1 August 2007.

In July 2016, KLM announced that, starting in October, it would serve the airport with direct flights from Amsterdam instead of the triangle route via Curaçao. The previous triangle route used a Boeing 747. The new direct route would use an Airbus A330. This change ended the airport's last regularly scheduled Boeing 747 service. The 747 made its last appearance at the airport on 28 October 2016. Maho Beach was almost completely covered with tourists and plane-spotters who came to witness the last landing and departure of the aircraft. In September 2017 it did make a brief return in the aftermath of Hurricane Irma, operating some relief flights. At the same time KLM announced the return of the triangle route via Curaçao, this time however operated by an Airbus A330. In September 2018, KLM officials confirmed that they hope to resume direct flights between Amsterdam and St. Maarten by November 2019.

On 6 September 2017, the airport suffered significant damage when Hurricane Irma struck the island as a Category 5 hurricane. Video from a Dutch military helicopter showed the roof had been blown off the terminal, the jetways were damaged, and there was a significant amount of sand (blown through the fences from Simpson Bay Beach) and flooding on the runway. The airport reopened on 10 October 2017 using temporary facilities while repair work commenced. Pavilions were in use during reconstruction of the main terminal. It was hoped to move the airport's departure and arrival operations into the ground floor of the main terminal building by November. In December 2018, temporary arrival and departure facilities opened within the first level of the terminal building. The entire upper floor of the terminal and the four jet-bridges remain temporarily out of commission.

Facilities

Runway
The airport has a single runway numbered 10/28, measuring 7,546 ft x 148 ft (2,300 m x 45 m).  It was renumbered from 09/27 in late 2008.

Pilots guided by GPS take a more efficient approach than those operating under VFR. Local airport rules prohibit aircraft from flying lower than 

Arriving aircraft approach the island on the last section of the final approach for Runway 10, following a 3° glide slope flying low over the famous Maho Beach. The proximity of Maho Beach to the runway has made the airport one of the world's favorite places among planespotters despite the dangers. In 2017 a New Zealand woman died from injuries sustained by jet blast from a departing aircraft. Tourists have been often criticised for dangerous behavior on the beach.

Apron
The main apron measures  with another  on Eastern apron.

Terminal
Designed to handle some 2.5 million passengers annually, the new four-story terminal building offered (at least until the arrival of Hurricane Irma)  of floor space and was fully air-conditioned. Available facilities included 46 check-in desks, 10 transit desks and 13 boarding gates. There were 20 immigration booths for arriving passengers and five exit-control booths for departing passengers. The building also featured 40 shops and food & beverage units—some unique to St. Maarten—promoted under the retail theme 'So Much More'.

General aviation
To accommodate the growing international and local traffic of private aircraft, PJIA has a fixed-base operator building, offering office space and private lounges with dedicated customs.

Tower
Besides providing approach, tower and ground control at PJIA, these controllers also provide approach control for Clayton J. Lloyd International Airport (Anguilla), L'Espérance Airport (French Saint Martin), Gustaf III Airport (St. Barths), F.D. Roosevelt Airport (St. Eustatius) and Juancho E. Yrausquin Airport (Saba).

Navigation
PJIA is equipped with VOR/DME and NDB. The airport's official operating hours are 07:00–21:00.

Airlines and destinations
The following airlines provide daily or weekly service to the following destinations.

Passenger

Notes
 Winair operates between Aruba and Sint Maarten but the flight stops in Curaçao on selected days.
 Winair operates between Bonaire and Sint Maarten but the flight stops in Curaçao on both trips.

Cargo

Statistics

Accidents and incidents
On 21 December 1972, a De Havilland Canada Twin Otter operated by Air Guadeloupe on behalf of Air France crashed at night into the ocean near Sint Maarten, en route from Guadeloupe; all 11 passengers on board, along with both pilots, died.
Both pilots died.

In popular culture
 Princess Juliana International Airport is the airport featured in the free demo version of Microsoft Flight Simulator X. In the full version of the program, it is the destination on the mission called "Caribbean Landing" where you land a Bombardier CRJ-700 on runway 10.
 The History Channel program Most Extreme Airports ranks Princess Juliana Airport as the 4th-most dangerous airport in the world.

See also
List of airports in Saint Martin
List of the busiest airports in the Caribbean
Skiathos Island National Airport
Sunset Bar and Grill

References

External links

Princess Juliana International Airport (Official Website)
Aviation Pioneers of the Caribbean

Airport information for TNCM at AirportNavFinder
Airport webcam, flight timetables & pilot data links

Airports in Sint Maarten
1943 establishments in Sint Maarten
Airports established in 1943
20th-century architecture in the Netherlands